Zəlimxan (also, Zelimkhan) is a village and municipality in the Agstafa Rayon of Azerbaijan.  It has a population of 1,163.

References 

Populated places in Aghstafa District